The 1932–33 season was Mansfield Town's second season in the Football League and first in the Third Division North after being transferred from the Third Division South. The Stags finished the campaign in 16th position with 35 points. During the season Mansfield recorded their record victory, a 9–2 win against Rotherham United on 27 December 1932 and their record defeat, an 8–1 loss to Walsall.

Final league table

Results

Football League Third Division North

FA Cup

Squad statistics
 Squad list sourced from

References
General
 Mansfield Town 1932–33 at soccerbase.com (use drop down list to select relevant season)

Specific

Mansfield Town F.C. seasons
Mansfield Town